Vyshgorod, literally "upper town" may refer to:

Vyshhorod, town in Vyshhorod Raion, Kyiv Oblast, Ukraine; medieval residence of Kyivan rulers
Vyshhorod Raion, raion in Kyiv Oblast, Ukraine, whose administrative centre is Vyshhorod
Vyshgorod, village in Ryazansky District, Ryazan Oblast, Russia
Vyshgorod, village in Kuvshinovsky District, Tver Oblast, Russia

See also
Visegrad (disambiguation)
Višegrad (disambiguation)
Wyszogród (disambiguation)
Vyshgorodok, village in Pytalovsky District, Pskov Oblast, Russia
Vyšehrad, historic fort in Prague, Czech Republic